Brian Drysdale (born 24 February 1943) is an English former professional footballer who played as a left back. He made over 500 appearances in the Football League in the 1960s and 70s.

Career
Brian Drysdale played junior football for Lincoln City. Drysdale made his League debut for Lincoln City before signing as a professional. Drysdale joined Hartlepool United on a free transfer in July 1965. Drysdale played under the Brian Clough and Peter Taylor management partnership and starred in the 1967-68 promotion from the Fourth Division when Hartlepool United finished in 3rd place. Hartlepool were relegated the following season finishing in 22nd place in the Third Division. Alan Dicks signed Drysdale in May 1969 for £10,000 from Hartlepool United for Bristol City. Drysdale had a loan spell at Reading in 1977. Drysdale left Bristol City to join Oxford United in July 1977.

Brian Drysdale then joined Western League side Frome Town as player manager. Drysdale was also player manager at Shepton Mallet before playing for Clevedon Town. Brian Drysdale finished his footballing career in the Bristol area with spells as player manager of Clandown F.C. and Hengrove F.C.

After retiring from playing Brian Drysdale became a self-employed carpenter in Stockwood, Bristol. His son Jason Drysdale was born in Bristol in 1970, also a left back, he played for England Youth and in Football League for Watford, Swindon Town and Northampton Town.

Honours
with Hartlepool United
Football League Fourth Division promotion: 1967–68

with Bristol City
Football League Second Division runners up: 1975–76

References

1943 births
Living people
People from Wingate, County Durham
Footballers from County Durham
English footballers
Association football fullbacks
Lincoln City F.C. players
Hartlepool United F.C. players
Bristol City F.C. players
Reading F.C. players
Oxford United F.C. players
Frome Town F.C. players
Shepton Mallet F.C. players
Clevedon Town F.C. players
English Football League players
Southern Football League players
Western Football League players
English football managers